The A405 is a 4.8 miles (7.7 km) dual carriageway road in Hertfordshire, England, from the A41 at Leavesden Green, near Watford, to the A414 at Park Street Roundabout near St Albans.

Route 
The A405 starts at a grade-separated roundabout junction with the A41 at Leavesden Green. From here, it travels northeast to a crossing with Sheepcot Lane at Woodside, then east to a traffic light junction with the A412 near Garston. This 1.4-mile (2.2-km) section is known as Kingsway.

From the A412, the A405 travels north, past West Hertfordshire Crematorium and Penfold Park Golf Course, to junction 6 of the M1 at Waterdale (2.3 miles, 3.7 km).

It then veers northeast, passing the village of Bricket Wood, before meeting the M25 at junction 21a (3.1 miles, 5 km). Drivers wishing to access the M25 from the M1 northbound, or the M1 southbound from the M25, must use this section of the A405 as the junction between the two motorways, known as Chiswell Interchange, does not feature the corresponding slip roads.
 
After the M25, the A405 continues northeast, with a roundabout junction with the B4630 for Chiswell Green (3.6 miles, 5.8 km), then another with Tippendell Lane for How Wood (4.2 miles, 6.8 km). The road terminates at Park Street Roundabout, a junction with the A414 and the A5183 (formerly part of the A5); until 2009 this was junction 1 of the M10.

Earlier route 

The A405 originally took up a greater proportion of the North Orbital Road. From Park Street Roundabout, it travelled east, crossing the River Ver and the Midland Main Line before meeting the A6 (now the A1081) at London Colney. It then veered northeast, past Colney Heath, before ending at the A1 near Hatfield. This gave it a total length of 9.7 miles (15.6 km).

The section of the A405 east of Park Street Roundabout was re-designated as part of the A414 (the original St Albans–Hatfield section of that road becoming the A1057).

In 1976, extending westwards to bypass Rickmansworth, the A405 joined the A412 at Maple Cross. In 1985, this section became part of the M25 motorway between junction 17 and 
junction 19. Junction 18 in Chorleywood is with the A404 was built in 1978.

References

External links

 Road to Nowhere: A405

Roads in England
Roads in Hertfordshire